Malye Chapurniki is a rural locality (a selo) in Svetloyarsky District, Volgograd Oblast, Russia. The population was 805 as of 2010. There are 4 streets.

Geography 
Malye Chapurniki is located 19 km west of Svetly Yar (the district's administrative centre) by road. Bolshiye Chapurniki is the nearest rural locality.

References 

Rural localities in Svetloyarsky District